The shortspine spurdog (Squalus mitsukurii) is a dogfish, a member of the family Squalidae, found on continental shelves off Japan in temperate waters, from the surface to 950 m.  Its length is up to 75 cm.

Taxonomy
The shortspine dogfish was once seen as a circumglobal species by many authors, including Compagno (1984) and Last & Stevens (1994). However, a series on papers published since 2007 have shown that a number of species synonymized with S. mitsukurii are distinct, and that the Hawaiian population of S. mitsukurii represent a distinct species, the Hawaiian spurdog.

References

Squalus
Fish described in 1903
Taxa named by David Starr Jordan